Benzoate degradation via hydroxylation is an enzyme-catalyzed, bacterial chemical reaction. Benzoate is degraded aerobically and anaerobically. Aerobic degradation forms catechol. Anaerobic degradation forms cyclohex-1,5-diene-1-carbonylCoA. A hybrid degradation forms Acetyl-CoA and Succinyl-CoA.

Potential microbes

References

Chemical reactions